David Ridgway (born April 24, 1959) is a former placekicker for the Saskatchewan Roughriders of the Canadian Football League. His CFL career began in 1981 when he was drafted by the Montreal Alouettes. He did not make the squad that year and returned to the University of Toledo to complete his degree in Marketing. Prior to the 1982 CFL season he signed as a free-agent with the Roughriders and began an impressive 14-year career with the club.

Ridgway is the eldest son of Leonard and Mary Ridgway, and has two younger brothers (John and Neil) and one sister (Lyn). Ridgway emigrated to Canada in 1974 and began his football career while attending M.M. Robinson High School in Burlington, Ontario. In 1977, he began his collegiate football career playing in the Mid American Conference with the University of Toledo Rockets.

His most famous kick as a Roughrider was a 35-yard field goal in the dying moments to lift the Roughriders to a 43-40 victory over the Hamilton Tiger-Cats in the 1989 Grey Cup in what was arguably one of the most thrilling Grey Cup games in history. The game was played in the newly opened Toronto SkyDome and brought the province of Saskatchewan only their second Grey Cup victory in the team's long and storied history.

Ridgway is considered one of the best placekickers to ever play the Canadian game and was known for his dependability in clutch situations. He is one of the most accurate kickers in CFL history for those who have attempted more than 150 career field goals. During his 14-year tenure he attempted 736 field goals and made 574 (78%).  He played in 238 games, all with the Roughriders.

In 1987 Ridgway made a then CFL record 60-yard field goal (since surpassed by Paul McCallum in 2001 when he hit from 62 yards; it was the first time in CFL history a field goal was made from that distance). He still holds or shares a number of CFL records such as 59 field goals made in a season in 1990, and 8 field goals made in a game (which he did twice, in 1984 & 1988).  Ridgway held the record for most consecutive field goals made, with 28 in 1993. This record—particularly impressive because the majority of his kicks were attempted in the windy confines of Taylor Field—was also bested by McCallum who connected on 30 straight field goals in 2011.  Both Ridgway's and McCallum's streaks ended with misses in BC Place Stadium.  The current professional football record for consecutive field goals is held by Lewis Ward, whose 69 consecutive goal streak ended in 2019.

His nickname was "Robokicker". and it also the title of his best selling autobiography, Robokicker: An Odyssey through the CFL, which was co-written with David A. Poulsen and published in 1995.

Awards and honours
CFL All-Star, 1982, 1987, 1988, 1989, 1990 and 1993
Dave Dryburgh Memorial Trophy Winner, 1989, 1990, 1991
Dick Suderman Trophy (Most Outstanding Canadian in a Grey Cup), 1989

His jersey number 36 is one of only eight jerseys retired by the Roughrider organization. Ridgway was inducted into the Roughriders Plaza of Honour in 2000 and the Canadian Football Hall of Fame in 2003.

References

External links
 Virtual Saskatchewan – former Roughrider Place-kicker Dave Ridgway: 10 years after 
 EventsEdge.com profile

1959 births
Living people
Canadian Football Hall of Fame inductees
Canadian football placekickers
English emigrants to Canada
English players of American football
English players of Canadian football
Sportspeople from Stockport
People from Burlington, Ontario
Players of Canadian football from Ontario
Saskatchewan Roughriders players
Toledo Rockets football players